Marius Louw (born 24 October 1995) is a South African professional rugby union player for the  in URC and in the Currie Cup. His regular position is centre, but he also played as a flanker earlier in his career.

Rugby career

2008–2013: Schoolboy rugby

He played for them as early as primary school level, at the Under-13 Craven Week in 2008.

2014–2021: Sharks / UKZN Impi

After high school, Louw moved to Durban to join the  academy. He started the first three matches of the 's 2014 Under-19 Provincial Championship season as a flanker before moving into the backline in the centre position, where he played for the rest of the season. Louw also started the semi-final, but could not prevent his side losing the match 20–43 to the Blue Bulls.

He started four of their eight matches during the regular season, scoring eight tries. UKZN Impi finished in second spot on the log to qualify for the final, in which Louw started and helped his side to a 29–24 victory over Wits to win the title for the first time.

Soon after the conclusion of the Varsity Shield, Louw was also drafted into the  squad for the 2015 Vodacom Cup. He was promoted to the starting lineup for his home debut against the  a week later, scoring two tries in a 52–12 victory in Empangeni. The team finished sixth on the Southern Section log, failing to qualify for the quarter finals.

After coming on as a replacement in the s' second match of the Under-21 Provincial Championship season, he firmly established himself as the team's first-choice inside centre, starting ten of their remaining eleven matches in that position.

Louw was named in the  Super Rugby squad for the 2016 season, but didn't feature in any matches for the team. Instead, he continued his development with the UKZN Impi in the 2016 Varsity Shield, making seven appearances. He scored one try against  and two against  as his team won seven of their eight matches.

Louw was again named in the  squad – participating in the 2016 Currie Cup qualification series that effectively replaced the Vodacom Cup – and made six appearances.

At the end of October 2016, he was included in the  Super Rugby squad for the 2017 season.

References

South African rugby union players
Living people
1995 births
Rugby union players from Bloemfontein
Rugby union flankers
Rugby union centres
Sharks (Currie Cup) players
Sharks (rugby union) players
Lions (United Rugby Championship) players